, also known by his Chinese style name , was a politician and bureaucrat of the Ryukyu Kingdom.

He was the fourth head of an aristocrat family called Mō-uji Zakimi Dunchi.

In 1737, a Yaeyama-based vessel was shipwrecked off the coast of Hizen Province, and the crew were rescued by Saga Domain. Zakimi Seishū was dispatched as a gratitude envoy to Japan in 1737. 

Zakimi served as a member of Sanshikan from 1750 to 1752.

References

1699 births
1766 deaths
Ueekata
Sanshikan
People of the Ryukyu Kingdom
Ryukyuan people
18th-century Ryukyuan people